Syria TV, also known as Syrian Satellite Channel, is a satellite television channel a  nationwide public broadcasting, state-funded by the Syrian General Organization of Radio and TV and broadcast throughout the world on various satellites. The television station is based in Damascus, Syria since July 1960.

Programs
Syria TV features a variety of general-interest programs.

Syrian soap operas (Syrian Drama, مسلسلات سوريا دراما)
Aalam men Akhbar (A World of News, عالم من الأخبا)
Jilna (Our Generation, جيلنا)
Sabah al Khair (Good Morning, صباح الخير)
Al-Nas lel Nas (People for People, الناس للناس)
Hamzet Wasel (Connecting Link, همزة وصل)
Al-Balad Baladak (The Country is your Country, البلد بلدك)
Mulaeb al Ghad (Tomorrow's Player, ملاعب الغد)
Huna Dimashq (Here is Damascus, هنا دمشق)
Nahja Maan (Living Together, نحيا معا)
Al-Muwaten w el-Wazeer (The Citizen and the Minister, المواطن و الوزير	)
Hadis Al-Balad (Talk of the Town, حديث البلد)
Bath Mubashar (Live Broadcast, بث مباشر)
Most of the programmes are in Arabic. There is also a number of English programmes and some news broadcasts in English, French, Spanish, Russian and recently Turkish.

During the Syrian Civil War
On May 26, 2013, Opposition forces opened fire on the Syria TV team near al-Daba'a village in the countryside of al-Qusayr in Homs province, injuring cameraman Asem al-Shaar.

References

External links
Syria TV official website 
Syria TV live stream 
Syria TV official website 

1995 establishments in Syria
Television channels in Syria
Arabic-language television stations
Mass media in Damascus
Television channels and stations established in 1995